Sebastián Eduardo Pardo Campos (born 1 January 1982) is a Chilean former professional footballer who played as a midfielder.

Club career
Pardo was born in Quillota. He began his career at Universidad de Chile, and joined Eredivisie's Feyenoord in 2002–03, debuting on 10 September 2002, against Excelsior Rotterdam (4–1 win), scoring his first goal for Feyenoord in that match. He was largely used as a backup at Feyenoord during the five years he spent there, and joined Excelsior in 2007–08.

In July 2008, he returned to Chile to play again for Universidad de Chile. On 9 June 2009, he announced his retirement from football, because of family problems.

International career 
Pardo represented Chile at under-17 level in the 1999 South American Championship in Uruguay and Chile at under-20 level in both the 2001 South American Championship in Ecuador and the 2001 FIFA World Youth Championship in Argentina.

At senior level, Pardo represented Chile once, in 2002.

Controversies
Previous to 2001 FIFA World Youth Championship, Pardo and seven other players were arrested in a brothel what must to be closed. The incident was known as "El episodio de las luces rojas" (Chapter of the red lights) due to the excuse employed by Jaime Valdés.

After the tournament, the eight players (Valdés, Millar, Salgado, Órdenes, Soto, Droguett, Campos and Pardo) were suspended for three international matches.

Honours
Universidad de Chile
 Primera División de Chile: 1999, 2000, 2009 Apertura
Copa Chile: 1998, 2000

References

External links
 
 

1982 births
Living people
People from Quillota
Chilean footballers
Association football midfielders
Chile international footballers
Chile under-20 international footballers
Chile youth international footballers
Chilean Primera División players
Primera B de Chile players
Eredivisie players
Universidad de Chile footballers
Feyenoord players
Excelsior Rotterdam players
Unión Temuco footballers
Coquimbo Unido footballers
Chilean expatriate footballers
Chilean expatriate sportspeople in the Netherlands
Expatriate footballers in the Netherlands